The men's shot put competition at the 2018 Asian Games took place on 25 August 2018 at the Gelora Bung Karno Stadium.

Schedule
All times are Western Indonesia Time (UTC+07:00)

Records

Results 
Legend
NM — No mark

References

Men's shot put
2018 Men